Osan University Station is a station on Seoul Subway Line 1. Osan University, despite the name of the station, is about a mile away from this station, and is closer to the next station on Line 1.

Arboretum
The Mulhyanggi Arboretum is within 5 minutes' walking distance. In Korean, mul means 'water' and hyanggi means fragrance. Operated by Gyeonggi Province and opened in May, 2006, the gardens feature 1,600 species.

References

Seoul Metropolitan Subway stations
Railway stations opened in 2005
Metro stations in Osan